Redondo Beach (Spanish for ) is a coastal city in Los Angeles County, California, United States, located in the South Bay region of the Greater Los Angeles area. It is one of three adjacent beach cities along the southern portion of Santa Monica Bay. The population was 71,576 at the 2020 census, up from 66,748 at the 2010 census.

Redondo Beach was originally part of the 1785 Rancho San Pedro Spanish land grant that later became the South Redondo area. The primary attractions include Municipal Pier and the sandy beach, popular with tourists and a variety of sports enthusiasts. The western terminus of the Metro Rail C Line (formerly the Green Line) is in North Redondo Beach.

History 

The Chowigna Indians used the site of today's Hopkins Wilderness Park, formerly Nike missile site LA-57 from 1956 to 1963, in Redondo Beach, California, as a lookout place. The wetlands located at the site of today's AES power plant in Redondo Beach were a source of foods including halibut, lobster, and sea bass, and also of salt.

In the 1700s, the Chowigna bartered salt from the old Redondo Salt Lake, "a spring-fed salt lake about 200 yards wide and 600 yards long situated about 200 yards from the ocean", with other tribes. Their village by the lake was called "Onoova-nga", or "Place of Salt."

The Chowigna were relocated to missions in 1854, when Manuel Dominguez sold  of Rancho San Pedro, including the lake, to Henry Allanson and William Johnson for the Pacific Salt Works.

Moonstone Beach was a tourist attraction from the late 1880s to the early 1920s. Tourists gathered moonstones from the many mounds that had washed ashore during storms.

Geography

According to the United States Census Bureau, the city has a total area of 6.2 square miles (16.1 km2), over 99% of it land.

Redondo Beach was originally part of the 1784 Rancho San Pedro Spanish land grant of the  Dominguez Rancho that later became the ten-mile (16 km) ocean frontage of Rancho Sausal Redondo.

Neighborhoods

The ocean side of Pacific Coast Highway (PCH) has restaurants and boating activities while inland of PCH is largely residential. Redondo Breakwall is a well-known surf spot in the South Bay. This power plant sports Whaling Wall number 31, a  whale mural by artist Robert Wyland titled "Gray Whale Migration".

Redondo Beach has a distinct division between the north and south sections of the city, with 190th, Anita, and Herondo streets forming its east–west boundary line. South Redondo is along the beachfront with the pier and marina/harbor complex. The small business district near the pier and marina was revived in the 1990s. That district was once focused on fishing and canning when the pier was used to transport fish-based foodstuffs and canned fish to American and Asian consumers, but that industry experienced an economic downfall in the 1970s and 1980s. The main library is located in the Civic Center.

North Redondo, north of 190th Street, is an inland community separated from the beachfront by Hermosa Beach and Manhattan Beach. While primarily residential, North Redondo contains some of the city's major industrial and commercial space, including the inland aerospace and engineering firms that are part of Southern California's long space legacy. It is also home to the South Bay Galleria shopping center and Artesia Boulevard. North Redondo is the home of the Redondo Beach Performing Arts Center and the Los Angeles Ballet. The North Branch of the Redondo Beach Library serves this area.

Zoning allows properties within two to three blocks of the beach to be developed as large, two to three-unit luxury townhomes; inland areas are more likely to have single-family homes.

The Marina, Harbor and Pier complexes are planned centers of activity that host seafood restaurants, bars, and smaller shops.

Lifestyle

Much of the Redondo Beach lifestyle is a blend of the neighborhoods, activities and people of the three Beach Cities of Southern California's South Bay. Like its sister cities of Hermosa Beach and Manhattan Beach, Redondo's draw is the beach that links the three cities. Redondo was described as "The Gem of the Continent" in the Los Angeles Daily Herald in 1887.

The beach starts below the bluffs of Palos Verdes in the south (after Torrance Beach) and carries north to the Redondo Pier. The area of the beach that starts in Palos Verdes is known as "RAT (Right After Torrance) Beach."

Climate

Redondo Beach has a warm-summer Mediterranean climate (Köppen climate classification: Csb) with mild winters and warm, almost rainless summers. The coldest months are December through March, and the warmest months are July through September. Redondo Beach has mild temperatures year round due to its coastal location.

Demographics

2020
The 2020 census found that greater than 50% of Redondo Beach’s residents are white, nearly double the rate of the greater Los Angeles area.

Redondo Beach, like its neighboring beach towns, has become one of the most exclusionary cities in Los Angeles by limiting housing production, resulting in a median home costing $1.4 million, 60% higher than the regional average for Los Angeles.

2010
The 2010 United States Census reported that Redondo Beach had a population of 66,748. The racial makeup of Redondo Beach was 49,805 (74.6%) White (65.2% Non-Hispanic White), 1,852 (2.8%) African American, 291 (0.4%) Native American, 8,004 (12.0%) Asian, 199 (0.3%) Pacific Islander, 2,725 (4.1%) from other races, and 3,872 (5.8%) from two or more races. Hispanic or Latino of any race were 10,142 persons (15.2%).

The Census reported that 66,317 people (99.4% of the population) lived in households, 367 (0.5%) lived in non-institutionalized group quarters, and 64 (0.1%) were institutionalized.

There were 29,011 households, out of which 7,825 (27.0%) had children under the age of 18 living in them, 12,507 (43.1%) were opposite-sex married couples living together, 2,515 (8.7%) had a female householder with no husband present, 1,207 (4.2%) had a male householder with no wife present. There were 1,904 (6.6%) unmarried opposite-sex partnerships, and 179 (0.6%) same-sex married couples or partnerships. 9,252 households (31.9%) were made up of individuals, and 2,145 (7.4%) had someone living alone who was 65 years of age or older. The average household size was 2.29. There were 16,229 families (55.9% of all households); the average family size was 2.94.

Redondo Beach had 12,887 people (19.3%) under the age of 18, 4,198 people (6.3%) aged 18 to 24, 23,149 people (34.7%) aged 25 to 44, 19,532 people (29.3%) aged 45 to 64, and 6,982 people (10.5%) who were 65 years of age or older. The median age was 39.3 years. For every 100 females, there were 99.1 males. For every 100 females age 18 and over, there were 97.2 males.

The homeowner vacancy rate was 0.9%; the rental vacancy rate was 5.3%. 36,796 people (55.1% of the population) lived in owner-occupied housing units and 29,521 people (44.2%) lived in rental housing units.

According to the 2010 United States Census, Redondo Beach had a median household income of $99,496, with 5.4% of the population living below the federal poverty line.

2000

As of the census of 2000, there were 63,261 people, 28,566 households, and 15,254 families residing in the city. The population density was 10,065.4 inhabitants per square mile (3,889.4/km2). The racial makeup of the city was 78.6% White, 9.1% Asian, 2.5% African American, 0.5% Native American, 0.4% Pacific Islander, 4.4% from other races, and 4.6, % from two or more races. Hispanic or Latino of any race were 13.5% of the population.

There were 28,566 households, out of which 23.3% had children under the age of 18 living with them, 40.6% were married couples living together, 9.0% had a female householder with no husband present, and 46.6% were non-families. 33.1% of all households were made up of individuals, and 5.9% had someone living alone who was 65 years of age or older. The average household size was 2.21 and the average family size was 2.87.

In the city, 18.8% of the population was under the age of 18; 6.1%, aged 18 to 24; 43.1%, aged 25 to 44; 23.6%, aged 45 to 64; and 8.5% aged 65 or older. The median age was 37 years. For every 100 females, there were 101.5 males. For every 100 females age 18 and over, there were 99.8 males.

According to a 2007 estimate, the median income for a household in the city was $93,274, and the median income for a family was $108,753. Males had a median income of $56,796 versus $45,204 for females. The per capita income for the city was $38,305. About 4.0% of families and 5.9% of the population were below the poverty line, including 6.2% of those under age 18 and 6.1% of those age 65 or over.

Economy
According to the city's 2020 Comprehensive Annual Financial Report, the top employers in the city are:

Cost of living

According to public data from the Los Angeles Times, real estate prices increased almost 20% per year between 1999 and 2005. Properties within walking distance of the ocean routinely sell for over $1 million. Money Magazine ranks communities in the area as some of the most expensive places to live in the U.S. The average three-bed, two-bath home costs about $1,000,000 in South Redondo as of 2006 and  $875,000 in North Redondo. The 2007 "credit meltdown" has affected home values in the area to a lesser extent than the rest of Southern California.

Sports 

The Marvin Braude Bike Trail runs from Torrance through South Redondo, north to Hermosa Beach, Manhattan Beach, and eventually to Santa Monica. At the Redondo Beach King Harbor Marina and Pier complex, the path has onto dedicated lanes of surface streets for about a mile before again turning to the ocean in Hermosa Beach. Continuing north from Manhattan Beach, the path stretches to Marina Del Rey.

Surfing is an element of the South Bay lifestyle year-round. Winter storms in the Pacific Ocean sometimes turn typically placid and rolling South Bay waves into large and occasionally dangerous waves, a draw for surfers.

Beach volleyball is another aspect of Redondo Beach's lifestyle. Professional tournaments managed by the AVP take place in neighboring Hermosa and Manhattan Beach. Redondo Beach is home to gold medalist Kerri Walsh and AVP Pro Casey Jennings.

Government

Local government
Redondo Beach's City Council elections are held on the first Tuesday after the first Monday in March of odd-numbered years after the City Attorney notified California's Secretary of State of not moving both its City Council and Board of Education elections to a statewide primary or general election starting in 2018. The elections are all-mail instead of in-person.

The current mayor and council members are:

 Mayor: Bill Brand
 Council Members: Nils Nehrenheim, Todd Loewenstein, Christian Horvath, Zein Obagi, Jr., and Laura Emdee.

Local Miscellanea 
According to the city's 2012 Comprehensive Annual Financial Report, the city's various funds had $109.5 million in Revenues, $106.8 million in expenditures, $283.1 million in total assets, $66.3 million in total liabilities, and $79.5 million in cash and investments.

The Beach Cities Health District, one of 78 California Health Districts, is located in Redondo Beach. Created in 1955, as South Bay Hospital, to provide health and wellness services to the residents of Hermosa Beach, Manhattan Beach, and Redondo Beach. The district took on its current name in 1993. In 2002, Beach Cities Health District opened AdventurePlex, a Manhattan Beach fitness facility for youth and their families of the three beach cities. AdventurePlex has mazes, tunnels, outdoor rock climbing walls, complex ropes courses, and an indoor gymnasium.

The City of Redondo Beach is a Charter City in LA County, Southern California. Almost two thirds of the residents in LA County, the majority in Southern California, and a plurality of Californians live in Charter Cities according to the 2010 US Census. As a Californian Charter City, Redondo Beach can adopt Amendments to the City Charter.

State and federal representation

Politics
In the 2008 presidential election Barack Obama won 59% of the vote and John McCain won 37% of the vote.

Education
The Redondo Beach Unified School District serves the city. Redondo Union High School is the zoned high school, with the adjoining campus of Patricia Dreizler Continuation High School located to the east of the Redondo Union High School main grounds serving as a continuation school. The Redondo Beach Learning Academy, a community day school houses 9th-12th graders, is located on the South Bay Adult School campus in Redondo Beach. Dreizler continues to be recognized as a California Model Continuation High School. The Independent Study Program supports grades 9-12 and is housed on the Patricia Deizler campus. Additionally, Redondo Beach has two middle schools, Adams Middle School and Parras Middle School. Adams Middle School, located in North Redondo Beach, primarily serves 6th to 8th grade students in the North Redondo area, with Parras Middle School being the designated middle school of South Redondo Beach. The city also has eight established elementary schools: Alta Vista, Beryl Heights, Birney, Jefferson, Lincoln, Madison, Tulita and Washington. All twelve schools are evenly divided throughout the North and South areas of Redondo Beach, with five elementary schools and one middle school located in North/Central Redondo Beach; and three elementary schools, one middle school, and the singular designated high school placed in South Redondo Beach. The Redondo Beach Educational Foundation was founded in 1992 and revitalized in 2008.

Residents of Redondo Beach were in South Bay Union High School District until 1993, when it dissolved.

Valor Christian Academy (formerly Coast Christian School) is in Redondo Beach.

Infrastructure

The United States Postal Service operates the Redondo Beach Post Office at 1201 North Catalina Avenue, the Redondo Beach Station #2 Post Office at 1715 Via El Prado, the North Redondo Beach Post Office at 2215 Artesia Boulevard, and the Galleria Post Office at Suite 377D at 1815 Hawthorne Boulevard.

The Los Angeles County Department of Health Services operates the Torrance Health Center in Harbor Gateway, Los Angeles, near Torrance and serving Redondo Beach.

Redondo Beach Police Department
The Redondo Beach Police Department was established in the 1920s. The Police Department consists of 90 sworn members (officers) plus 57 non-sworn members.

Redondo Beach Public Library 

The first library in Redondo Beach began as a reading room in 1895. The first five-member Library Commission for the city was formed in November 1908. The library moved into the then City Hall's west wing in 1909 and eventually filled the entire west wing at 301 Emerald Street. In 1928 the Chamber of Commerce recommended a new library be built on the site previously occupied by the Hotel Redondo in what is now Veterans Park. The Veterans Park Library is a Spanish/Dutch colonial building designed by architect Lovel Bearse Pemberton and opened on July 2, 1930. It was placed on the National Register of Historic Places in 1981. After serving as the Main Library for the city for 60 years, a site adjacent to City Hall was identified for a new, modern Main Library building. The new Main Library for the City of Redondo Beach opened on July 8, 1995, at 303 N. Pacific Coast Highway. A North Branch Library was also established in 1930 and started at the Grant Community Hall, it then moved to its current location at 2000 Artesia Boulevard in 1949. A new North Branch Library was constructed on the site in 2009 and opened its doors on September 28, 2010. The North Branch Library is the first City owned Green building and received Gold LEED certification.

Public transportation
Redondo Beach is served by Beach Cities Transit and the Redondo Beach C Line station.

Historically, the city was served by the Santa Fe Railroad and Pacific Electric's Venice-Playa del Rey and Redondo Beach via Gardena lines.

Notable people

 Allan McCollum (born 1944), contemporary artist; grew up in Redondo Beach and graduated from Aviation High School
 Amazon Eve, the tallest model in the world at 
 Amy White, swimmer, 1984 Olympics silver medalist, born in Redondo Beach
 Bill Auberlen, race car driver
 Black Flag, the hardcore punk band, is from Redondo, Manhattan and Hermosa Beach.
 Buddy Handleson, actor
 Michael Burns (born 1947), actor on Wagon Train, It's a Man's World, and numerous films; historian, horse breeder; lived in Redondo Beach in 1970s
 Cameron Crowe, author, gathered research at a public school Redondo Beach for the basis of his novel Fast Times at Ridgemont High.
 Carl C. Cable spent part of his retirement in Redondo Beach.
 Carla Esparza (born 1987), professional female mixed martial artist attended Redondo Union High School.
 Casey Jennings, AVP Pro
 Charles Lindbergh attended Redondo Union High School
 Christian "CC" Coma (born Christopher Mora, 1985), musician, Black Veil Brides drummer; resident.
 Christopher Bartholomew, musician, vocalist of As Blood Runs Black; resident.
 Chyna (born Joan Marie Laurer; 1970–2016), professional female wrestler, entertainer, body builder, reality TV star, and adult film actress.
 Damon Edge, musician of band Chrome; resident; died in his Redondo Beach apartment in 1995
 Demi Moore (born 1962), actress; attended Redondo Union High School for a year
Eli Morgan (born 1996), baseball pitcher for the Cleveland Indians
 Edwin Mattison McMillan (1907–91), atomic scientist and Nobel Prize winner; born in Redondo Beach
 Mike Norris, professional actor
 Eve Torres, dancer, model, and WWE performer; resident
 George Freeth, introduced surfing to California
 Henry E. Huntington, owned 90 percent of Redondo Beach in 1905 and helped introduce surfing to California by bringing George Freeth to Redondo Beach from Hawaii
 Henry Rollins (born 1961), musician, actor, writer, television and radio host, comedian, Black Flag member; former resident.
 Hisaye Yamamoto (born 1921), Japanese-American writer; born in Redondo Beach.
 Jereme Rogers, professional skateboarder; resident
 Jesse Heiman, TV personality and actor
 Jim Fox, professional hockey player, TV analyst; resident 
Jolene Purdy, actress
 Judith Resnik, second American woman in space, killed in the Challenger disaster
 Kerri Walsh, Beach Volleyball Olympic gold medalist
 Lou Fleischer, composer
 Lynette "Squeaky" Fromme, former member of the Manson Family, attempted assassin of President Gerald Ford; former resident, Redondo Union High School alumna.
 Madison Chock, Olympic ice dancer
 Michael Dudikoff (born 1954), actor, born in Redondo Beach.
 Patrick Kearney (born 1940), serial murderer
 Pau Gasol, professional basketball player; resident
 Paul Westphal (born 1950), professional basketball player and coach; grew up in Redondo Beach, and attended Aviation High School.
 Rachel Wacholder (born 1975) - model and beach volleyball player
 Ron Artest, professional basketball player; resident
 Ron Kovic (born 1946), anti-war activist, veteran and writer who was paralyzed in the Vietnam War; best known as the author of his memoir Born on the Fourth of July; resident
 Sam Match (1923–2010), tennis player,  ranked among the top ten amateur players in the United States 
 Shannon Brown, professional basketball player; resident
 Slava Voynov, professional hockey player; resident
 The Smothers Brothers (Tom, born 1937; Dick, born 1939), musicians and actors; grew up in Redondo Beach and graduated from Redondo Union High School
 Thomas Welsh, professional basketball player; grew up in Redondo Beach
 Tiffany van Soest, kickboxer and resident
 Tommy Ryman, comedian and resident
 Traci Lords (born 1968), adult-film actress; attended Redondo Union High School
 Trixx (born 1991) musician, drummer of New Years Day; former resident.
 William Starke Rosecrans, a Delaware native, inventor, coal-oil company executive, diplomat, politician, and United States Army Major General during the American Civil War, bought  of land which later became Redondo Beach. Rosecrans Avenue, a major street in northern South Bay, is named after him. He died there at Rancho Sausal Redondo in 1898.

In popular culture

 Songs & videos
 Patti Smith's song "Redondo Beach", on her 1975 album Horses; covered by Morrissey in 2004 and released as a single in 2005
 Redondo Beach is mentioned in the song "Surfin' U.S.A." by The Beach Boys.
 The Edison Power Plant is the filming location of the music video for the Britney Spears song "(You Drive Me) Crazy".
 The Redondo Fun Factory at the Redondo Beach International Boardwalk is the filming location for the music video of Boys Like Girls' "Love Drunk".

Television

 The television show The O.C. used the beach and pier as a key filming location.
 As of 2009 the television show Dexter filmed scenes at the Redondo Pier.
 The television show 24 used the AES power plant in filming many scenes.
 The television show CSI: Miami has been filmed in Redondo Beach.
 The television show 90210 was filmed in the Riviera Village neighborhood of Redondo Beach.
 Three seasons of the television series Riptide were filmed in King Harbor.
 The television show Even Stevens filmed mall episodes at Redondo Beach's South Bay Galleria. They also used Aviation High School's track field for its outside gym scenes.
 The '90s television show California Dreams is set in Redondo Beach.
 The first-season episode of Star Trek: The Original Series titled "Operation -- Annihilate!" included scenes of the planet Deneva, which were filmed at the TRW headquarters in Redondo Beach.
 TruTV's show Speeders has made a few appearances in Redondo Beach.
 Extreme Makeover: Home Edition rebuilt a house for the Ripatti-Pearce family who reside in Redondo Beach.

Film
 Parts of the movie Point Break were filmed in Redondo Beach (such as the gas station fire/explosion scene took place at the intersection of Beryl and Catalina, and the foot chase past the Dive N' Surf shop).
Redondo Beach is the destination of the road-tripping family in the 2006 movie Little Miss Sunshine, although Ventura, California, stood in for Redondo Beach at the end of the film.
 Men at Work was filmed in Redondo Beach, which went by the pseudonym Las Playas
 Pirates of the Caribbean: At World's End was filmed off the coast of Redondo Beach. The Black Pearl, a cursed sea vessel, was moored in the harbor for several weeks in 2006.
 John Travolta's character Vincent Vega in the movie Pulp Fiction lives in Redondo Beach.
 The eponymous race in The Cannonball Run ended in Redondo Beach.
 The beach scene in Big Momma's House 2 was filmed in Redondo Beach and the pier.
 Redondo Beach is home of the fictional Bird of Paradise Motel in the 1990 film The Two Jakes.
 Parts of the 1988 movie Tequila Sunrise were filmed in Redondo Beach, specifically, on the Esplanade. Kurt Russell's character wears an RUHS (Redondo Union High School) class ring.
 The Hot Chick (2002), starring Rob Schneider, used the Redondo Union High School football stadium during the scene in which Schneider is pushed down the stadium's bleachers by co-star Anna Faris.
 In the movie 1408, the beach scene is set at Hermosa Pier and Redondo Beach.
 The opening scene of Heat, in which Robert De Niro descends an escalator, was filmed at the Redondo Beach C Line station.

Sister cities

 Ensenada, Mexico
 La Paz, Mexico
 Itoman, Japan
  Zhangjiagang, China

References

External links

 
 Redondo Beach News

 
South Bay, Los Angeles
1892 establishments in California
Cities in Los Angeles County, California
Incorporated cities and towns in California
Populated coastal places in California
Populated places established in 1892
Surfing locations in California